The year 1967 in spaceflight saw the most orbital launches of the 20th century and more than any other year until 2021, including that of the first Australian satellite, WRESAT, which was launched from the Woomera Test Range atop an American Sparta rocket. The United States National Space Science Data Center catalogued 172 spacecraft placed into orbit by launches which occurred in 1967.

The year saw both setbacks and advances for the United States Apollo programme. Three astronauts; Virgil "Gus" Grissom, Ed White and Roger B. Chaffee, were killed in a fire aboard the AS-204 spacecraft at Cape Kennedy Launch Complex 34 on 27 January whilst rehearsing the launch. On 20 October the Saturn V rocket made its maiden flight.

Launches

January

|}

February

|}

March

|-

|-

|-

|-

|-

|}

April

|}

May

|}

July

|}

August

|}

September

|}

October

|}

November

|}

December

|}

Deep Space Rendezvous

References

Footnotes

 
Spaceflight by year